Edward or Ed Meyer may refer to:

Edward C. Meyer (1928–2020), U.S. Army Chief of Staff
J. Edward Meyer (born 1935), former New York assembly member, and Connecticut state senator
Ed Meyer (American football) (1936–2014), American football player
Ted Meyer (1907–1981), rugby league footballer of the 1930s for New Zealand, and Northland